Jasmine Trinca (born 24 April 1981) is an Italian actress. Trinca was born in Rome, Italy. She began her career in 2001, chosen by Nanni Moretti for his award-winning The Son's Room, receiving the Guglielmo Biraghi prize as Best New Talent of the Year. In 2004, she won a Nastro d'Argento for The Best of Youth (La meglio gioventù). Trinca played again with Moretti in Il caimano (2006).

Filmography

References

External links

 
 Jasmine Trinca's Profile on www.shooting-stars.eu

1981 births
Living people
Actresses from Rome
Nastro d'Argento winners
21st-century Italian actresses
Italian film actresses
Italian television actresses
David di Donatello winners
Ciak d'oro winners
Marcello Mastroianni Award winners
Chopard Trophy for Female Revelation winners